John Hore (born 10 February 1947) is an English former footballer who played as a defender. He made 593 appearances in the Football League for Plymouth Argyle and Exeter City. He also served as manager at both clubs.

Hore appeared for Plymouth Argyle in midfield or as full back on 440 occasions. It was his task to mark Pelé when Santos lost to Argyle 3–2 at Home Park in March 1973. He finished his playing career at Exeter City.

He was appointed manager of Argyle on 1 October 1983. However, his managerial career was short-lived, owing to his lack of success in the league, he was dismissed on 19 November 1984.

In his 60-game stint as manager he won 17 games, lost 27 and drew 16. The highlight, for which he is most renowned, was leading Argyle to an FA Cup semi-final. A defeat to Watford meant that Argyle did not become the first team from the Third Division to reach the final.

He returned to Exeter City as coach and then caretaker manager before moving into management in local non-League football.

References
 
Plymouth Argyle 101 Golden Greats, Andy Riddle, 

1947 births
Living people
English footballers
Plymouth Argyle F.C. players
Exeter City F.C. players
English Football League players
English football managers
Bideford A.F.C. managers
Plymouth Argyle F.C. managers
Exeter City F.C. managers
Torrington F.C. managers
Barnstaple Town F.C. managers
English Football League managers
People from St Stephen-in-Brannel
Association football defenders